Beehole Branch is a stream in southwestern Butler County in the U.S. state of Missouri. It is a tributary of Tenmile Creek.

Beehole Branch was so named on account of the honeybees which frequented a watering hole along the creek's course.

See also
List of rivers of Missouri

References

Rivers of Butler County, Missouri
Rivers of Missouri